Wrestling World 2000 was a professional wrestling event produced by New Japan Pro-Wrestling (NJPW). It took place on January 4, 2000 in the Tokyo Dome. Wrestling World 2000 was the ninth January 4 Tokyo Dome Show held by NJPW. The show drew 53,500 spectators and $5,900,000 in ticket sales. The event saw the return of World Championship Wrestling's Chris Benoit under the ring name Wild Pegasus, reprising the character he played for NJPW in the early to mid-1990s. The show also featured Rick Steiner and Randy Savage, both working as freelancers brought in specifically for the show. The twelve match card saw a successful defense of the IWGP Junior Heavyweight Tag Team Championship and the IWGP Junior Heavyweight Championship as well as Kensuke Sasaki defeating Genichiro Tenryu to win the IWGP Heavyweight Championship. The undercard featured a match between Masahiro Chono defeated Keiji Mutoh bearing a stipulation that the losing wrestler's faction would have to disband. Chono represented Team 2000, while Mutoh represented nWo Japan. Through Mutoh's loss nWo Japan ceased to be. It also featured the retirement match of Kazuo Yamazaki, as he wrestled his student, Yuji Nagata.

Production

Background
The January 4 Tokyo Dome Show is NJPW's biggest annual event and has been called "the largest professional wrestling show in the world outside of the United States" and the "Japanese equivalent to the Super Bowl".

Storylines
Wrestling World 2000 featured professional wrestling matches that involved different wrestlers from pre-existing scripted feuds and storylines. Wrestlers portrayed villains, heroes, or less distinguishable characters in scripted events that built tension and culminated in a wrestling match or series of matches.

Results

References

External links
NJPW.co.jp 

2000 in professional wrestling
2000 in Tokyo
January 2000 events in Japan
2000